John Perry may refer to:

Politicians
John Perry (1845–1922), Australian politician, member for Richmond, Ballina and Byron
John Perry (1849–1935), Australian politician, member for Liverpool Plains
John Perry (Irish politician) (born 1956), Irish politician
John Perry (MP) (c. 1630–1732), English politician, MP for New Shoreham
John C. Perry (1832–1884), New York politician, and Wyoming Chief Justice
John D. Perry (born c. 1935), New York state senator
John H. Perry (1848–1928), American lawyer, judge and politician
John J. Perry (1811–1897), U.S. Representative from Maine
John R. Perry (judge) (born 1954), Wyoming judge and politician

Sportspeople
John Perry (footballer) (born 1945), Australian football player
Pete Perry (basketball) (John Perry, born 1948), American basketball player
John Perry (American football, born 1950), American football coach
John Perry (American football, born 1969), American football coach
Johnny Perry (1972–2002), American strongman competitor

Others
John Perry (musician) (born 1952), English musician, guitarist with The Only Ones
John G. Perry (born 1947), English bass guitarist with Quantum Jump
John Perry (philosopher) (born 1943), American philosopher
John Bennett Perry (born 1941), American actor
John Perry (bishop) (born 1935), Anglican Bishop of Southampton and Chelmsford
John Curtis Perry (born 1930), East Asian and Oceanic studies professor
John R. Perry (1899–1955), U.S. Rear Admiral, Pacific Fleet, World War II
John Perry (engineer) (1850–1920), Irish engineer
John Perry (judge) (1937–2007), judge of the Supreme Court of South Australia
John Perry (shipbuilder) (1743–1810), British ship builder
John Perry (priest) (1920–2017), Archdeacon of Middlesex
John Perry, English singer, member of Grapefruit and Tony Rivers and the Castaways
John Perry, playwright who collaborated with M. J. Farrell
John Perry, the protagonist in the novel Old Man's War by John Scalzi

See also
Jack Perry (disambiguation)
John Parry (disambiguation)